Willie Fritz (born April 2, 1960) is an American football coach and former player. He is the head football coach at Tulane. Fritz served as the head football coach at University of Central Missouri from 1997 to 2009, Sam Houston State University from 2010 to 2013, and Georgia Southern University from 2014 to 2015.  From 1993 to 1996, he was the head football coach at Blinn College, a junior college in Brenham, Texas, where he led his teams to consecutive NJCAA National Football Championships, in 1995 and 1996.

Playing career
Born in Shawnee Mission, Kansas, Fritz played college football at Pittsburg State University, where he was a defensive back for the Gorillas.

Coaching career
From 1993 to 1996, Fritz was head coach at Blinn College. He turned around a program that had gone 5–24–1 in its three previous seasons, producing a 39–5–1 record. Willie Fritz led the team to two national junior college championships, in 1995 and 1996. For his efforts at Blinn, Fritz has been inducted into the NJCAA Hall of Fame.

Fritz coached at the University of Central Missouri from 1997 until 2009, leading the Mules to their first post-season berth in 32 years when they defeated Minnesota-Duluth in the 2001 Mineral Water Bowl. In 2002, Central Missouri earned its first NCAA Division II playoff berth after winning the Mid-America Athletic Association (MIAA) championship. Fritz became the university's winningest coach with a 97–47 record.

Fritz was the second member of his family to coach at Central Missouri. His father, the late Harry Fritz, was the Mules' head football coach in 1952 and later became executive director of the National Association of Intercollegiate Athletics (NAIA).

Fritz became the 14th head football coach at Sam Houston State University on December 18, 2010. During the 2011 season, his second year at Sam Houston State, Fritz coached the Bearkats to the FCS's only undefeated regular season and into the FCS playoffs. He coached the Bearkats to back-to-back national title game appearances in 2011 and 2012 in only three years of being head coach at Sam Houston State.

Before his coaching career, Fritz served as a graduate assistant for the Bearkat squads that went 16–6 in 1984–85 and won the 1985 Gulf Star Conference championship. He went on to become the secondary and special teams coach for the Bearkats in 1991 and 1992, helping lead Sam Houston to a Southland Conference championship.

On January 10, 2014, Fritz became the head football coach at Georgia Southern University. In the Eagles' first FBS season, the team finished the season 9–3 overall and was undefeated in Sun Belt Conference play at 8–0, winning the outright conference championship. They were also the first team ever to go unbeaten in conference play in their first FBS season. In the 2015 season, Fritz led the Eagles to an 8-4 record, receiving their first bowl bid to the GoDaddy Bowl on December 23, 2015, where they defeated Bowling Green.

On December 11, 2015, ESPN reported that Fritz would become the 39th head football coach at Tulane University.

Personal life
Fritz and his wife, Susan, have three children, Wesley, Lainie, and Brooke.

Head coaching record

College

*left for Tulane before bowl game

References

External links
 Tulane profile

1960 births
Living people
American football defensive backs
Blinn Buccaneers football coaches
Central Missouri Mules football coaches
Georgia Southern Eagles football coaches
Pittsburg State Gorillas football coaches
Pittsburg State Gorillas football players
Sam Houston Bearkats football coaches
Tulane Green Wave football coaches
High school football coaches in Kansas
High school football coaches in Texas